Walter Webster (3 June 1906 – 17 November 1942) was an English footballer who played as a central defender for Rochdale and Barrow. He also played non-league football for various other clubs.
 Webster died on 17 November 1942 in Tunisia while serving with The Parachute Regiment, A.A.C.

References

Rochdale A.F.C. players
Barrow A.F.C. players
Sheffield Wednesday F.C. players
Worksop Town F.C. players
Chester City F.C. players
Mossley A.F.C. players
Oswestry Town F.C. players
Guildford City F.C. players
Workington A.F.C. players
Footballers from Rochdale
English footballers
Association football defenders
British Army personnel killed in World War II
British Parachute Regiment soldiers
1906 births
1942 deaths
Military personnel from Manchester